The  was the eighth annual professional wrestling single-elimination tournament promoted by World Wonder Ring Stardom in Tokyo and Osaka. The event took place between April 3 and April 29, 2022, with a limited attendance due in part to the ongoing COVID-19 pandemic at the time.

Storylines
The show featured professional wrestling matches with scripted storylines, where wrestlers portray villains, heroes, or less distinguishable characters in the scripted events that built tension and culminate in a wrestling match or series of matches. The matches can be won by pinfall, submission or elimination over the top rope. A time-limit draw or a double elimination means a loss for each competitor.

Event

Night 1 (April 3)
The first day of the event which took place on April 3, 2022, portraited the first-round tournament matches and started with a returning Hina who fell short to Unagi Sayaka and Waka Tsukiyama quickly getting rolled up by Saki Kashima. These two matches were broadcast on Stardom's YouTube channel as the preshow matches. Fourteen other matches occurred. In the only second-round match of the evening, Maika and Saya  Kamitani went into a double over-the-top rope elimination. Maika challenged Kamitani for the Wonder of Stardom Championship at Stardom Golden Week Fight Tour on May 5 which the latter accepted. The main event portrays Syuri who defeated her new bodyguard Ami Sourei. Syuri revealed her new unit's name as "God's Eye", and another recruit into the stable was Mirai who quietly quit Donna Del Mondo to align herself with Syuri and Sourei.

Night 2 (April 10)
The second day of the event which took place on April 10, 2022, portraited one of the tournament's second-round matches, where Syuri and Himeka went into a time-limit draw, therefore attracting their disqualification from the tournament. Post match, Syuri figured it out that Himeka wants a shot to the World of Stardom Championship which Syuri was willing to give to the latter. In the other tournament match, Hazuki defeated the High Speed Champion AZM, and because of Syuri and Himeka's double disqualification, she received a walkover victory which launched herself directly to the semi-finals. In the main event, Momo Watanabe and Starlight Kid successfully defended the Goddess of Stardom Championship against Giulia and Thekla. After their victory, Koguma and Hazuki stepped up as their new challengers to demand their rematch for the titles which the Oedo Tai's subgroup accepted.

Night 3 (April 17)
The third night of the tournament which took place on April 17, 2022, saw Koguma, Natsupoi and Mirai making their ways to the semi-finals from April 29. Queen's Quest announced that they will hold an election to determine the unit's new leader and Syuri had announced that a female bodyguard from her new God's Eye stable would be debuting superstar. The show also featured a returning Konami who reached out via video message, announcing that they will be supporting God's Eye during the upcoming Golden Week Tour in May.

Night 4 (April 29)
The fourth and last night of the event occurred on April 29, 2022, and featured the semi-finals and finals of the 2022 Cinderella Tournament. The preshow match between Ami Sourei, Mai Sakurai ans Waka Tsukiyama was broadcast on Stardom's YouTube channel. New Japan Pro Wrestling legend Yuji Nagata joined the commentary table for the night. After winning the gauntlet tag match, Tam Nakano, Mina Shirakawa and Unagi Sayaka received future match challenges from the Color's unit members Saki, Hikari Shimizu, Rina Amikura and Yuko Sakurai who stepped up for the Cosmic Angels members. Mirai won the 2022 edition of the Cinderella Tournament by defeating Koguma in the finals. She became the second wrestler to win the tournament in her debuting year after Giulia in 2020. Mirai declared her wish as being a Wonder of Stardom Championship match for the Stardom Flashing Champions event on May 28.

The main event portraited the confrontation between Syuri and Himeka for the World of Stardom Championship, bout which solded with God's Eye leader retaining.

Participants
The tournament started with 31 competitors entering it, including the champions. Syuri and Saya Kamitani who at the time of the event were World and Wonder of Stardom Champions received a bye, therefore automatically qualifying for the second-round. However, at the event's press conference from March 29, 2022, it was revealed that Ami Miura (later Ami Sourei), Syuri's new stable bodyguard would challenge the latter to a match in the first rounds of the tournament. Miura would go under the name of Ami Sourei and was officially presented as a new member of Stardom's roster.

*Noted underneath are the champions who held their titles at the time of the tournament.
{| class="wikitable sortable" align="left center" 
|-
!Wrestler
!Unit
!Notes
|-
|Ami Sourei
|God's Eye
|
|-
|AZM
|Queen's Quest
|High Speed Champion
|-
|Giulia
|Donna Del Mondo
|
|-
|Hanan
|Stars
|Future of Stardom Champion
|-
|Hazuki
|Stars
|
|-
|Himeka
|Donna Del Mondo
|Artist of Stardom Champion
|-
|Hina
|Queen's Quest
|
|-
|Fukigen Death
|Oedo Tai
|
|-
|Koguma
|Stars
|
|-
|Lady C
|Queen's Quest
|
|-
|Mai Sakurai
|Donna Del Mondo
|
|-
|Maika
|Donna Del Mondo
|Artist of Stardom Champion
|-
|Mayu Iwatani
|Stars
|
|-
|Mina Shirakawa
|Cosmic Angels
|
|-style="background: gold"
|Mirai
|Donna Del Mondo/God's Eye
|Winner
|-
|Miyu Amasaki
|Queen's Quest
|
|-
|Momo Kohgo
|Stars
|
|-
|Momo Watanabe
|Oedo Tai
|Goddess of Stardom Champion
|-
|Natsupoi
|Donna Del Mondo
|Artist of Stardom Champion
|-
|Rina
|Oedo Tai
|
|-
|Ruaka
|Oedo Tai
|
|-
|Saki Kashima
|Oedo Tai
|
|-
|Saya Iida
|Stars
|
|-
|Saya Kamitani
|Queen's Quest
|Wonder of Stardom Champion
|-
|Starlight Kid
|Oedo Tai
|Goddess of Stardom Champion
|-
|Syuri
|God's Eye
|World of Stardom Champion
|-
|Tam Nakano
|Cosmic Angels
|
|-
|Thekla
|Donna Del Mondo
|SWA World Champion
|-
|Unagi Sayaka
|Cosmic Angels
|
|-
|Utami Hayashishita
|Queen's Quest
|
|-
|Waka Tsukiyama
|Cosmic Angels
|

Brackets

Notes

References

External links
Page Stardom World

2022 in professional wrestling
2022 in Tokyo
Women's professional wrestling shows
World Wonder Ring Stardom shows
World Wonder Ring Stardom
Professional wrestling in Tokyo